Nikolaus Selnecker (or Selneccer) (December 5, 1530 – May 24, 1592) was a German musician, theologian and Protestant reformer. He is now known mainly as a hymn writer. He is also known as one of the principal authors of the Formula of Concord along with Jakob Andreä and Martin Chemnitz.

Biography
Nikolaus Selnecker was born in Hersbruck in Bavaria, Germany. His father moved him and his family to Nuremberg while he was still a child. At a young age he was an organist at the chapel in the Kaiserburg. He studied under Melanchthon at the University of Wittenberg, graduating M. A. in 1554. Later he was a  chaplain and musician at the court of Augustus, Elector of Saxony in Dresden. Additionally he served as a court tutor and supervised education in the court chapel. He was later appointed  professor of theology at Leipzig University, and  pastor of St. Thomas's Church.

References

Other sources
Jungkuntz, Ted (2001)	Formulators of the Formula of Concord: Four Architects of Lutheran Unity (Wipf and Stock Publishers)

Related Reading
Gritsch,   Eric W. (2010) A History of Lutheranism  (Fortress Press)

External links
Biography at Bach Cantatas Website

1530 births
1592 deaths
People from Hersbruck
16th-century Latin-language writers
German Lutherans
German male musicians
German Lutheran hymnwriters
16th-century hymnwriters
16th-century Lutheran theologians